Louis Joblot (9 August 1645 – 27 April 1723) was a French naturalist. He was born in Bar-le-Duc and died, aged 57, in Paris.

Publications 
 Louis Joblot, Descriptions et usages de plusiers nouveaux microscopes tant simples que composez ; avec de nouvelles observations faites sur de multitude innombrable d'insectes, & d'autres animaux de diverses especes, qui naissent dans des liqueurs préparées, & dans celles qui ne le sont point, J. Collombat, printer, Paris, 1718.

Sources 
 Hubert Lechevalier, "Louis Joblot and His Microscopes", Bacteriological Reviews, Vol.40, No.1, March 1976, p. 241-258. PDF
 P.W. van der Pas, "Joblot, Louis", Complete Dictionary of Scientific Biography, 2008.

References

External links 
 Observer au XVIIIe : Louis Joblot et ses microscopes
 Louis Joblot on Encyclopedia Universalis
 Louis Joblot – the other father of microscopy
  Louis Joblot and his Microscopes
 Joblot, Louis on the Galileo Project
  The Ridiculed Rival of Leeuwenhoeck: Louis Joblot

French naturalists
1645 births
People from Bar-le-Duc
1723 deaths